was secretary general of Japan's Liberal Democratic Party from 2004 to 2006. He was succeeded by Hidenao Nakagawa.

References

|-

|-

People from Hokkaido
Waseda University alumni
1941 births
Living people
Liberal Democratic Party (Japan) politicians
21st-century Japanese politicians